I Never Even Asked for Light is the second studio album by Lullaby for the Working Class. It was released October 21, 1997 on Bar/None Records.

Track listing 
 "Untitled"                                                                                                                           
 "Show Me How the Robots Dance"                                                                                                               
 "Irish Wake"                                                                                                                                  
 "Jester's Siren"                                                                                                                              
 "Hypnotist (Song for Daniel H.)"                                                                                                              
 "In Honor of My Stumbling"                                                                                                                    
 "This Is As Close As We Get"                                                                                                                  
 "The Sunset & The Electric Bill"                                                                                                               
 "Bread Crumbs"                                                                                                                               
 "Descent"                                                                                                                                    
 "The Man Vs. the Tide (Part 1)"                                                                                                                       
 "The Man Vs. the Tide (Part 2)"                                                                                                                      
 "The Man Vs. the Tide (Part 3)"

Personnel
A.J. Mogis - bass, production, recording
Ben McMahan - cello
Erin Hill - clarinet
Eric Medley - bass clarinet
Jason Carper, Shane Aspegren - drums
Ken Beck - French horn
Mike Mogis - guitar, banjo, mandolin, glockenspiel, chimes, melodica, organ, hammered dulcimer, kalimba, percussion, production, recording
Eric Medley - mastering
Andy Strain - trombone
Nate Walcott - trumpet
Chris Higgins - violin
Ted Stevens - voice, guitar, ukulele

References

1997 albums
Lullaby for the Working Class albums
Bar/None Records albums